Sebastián Decoud was the defending champion, but he chose to not compete this year.
Ivan Sergeyev defeated Dustin Brown 6–3, 5–7, 6–4 in the final.

Seeds

Draw

Final four

Top half

Bottom half

References
 Main Draw
 Qualifying Draw

Almaty Cup - Singles
Almaty Cup